The Men's Asian Champions Trophy is an event held annually by the Asian Hockey Federation (since 2011). It features Asia's top six field hockey teams during that hockey season competing in a round robin format. India and Pakistan are the joint most successful teams in this tournament's history.

India and Pakistan are the joint defending champions of the Men's Trophy as they were declared joint winners of 2018 Men's Asian Champions Trophy.

Results

Summary

* = host nation
^ = title shared

Team appearances

See also
Men's Hockey Asia Cup
Women's Asian Champions Trophy

References

External links
Asian Hockey Federation

 
Champions Trophy
Asian Champions Trophy